This article contains a list of all of the classes and orders that are located in the Phylum Chordata.

Subphylum Cephalochordata

Class Leptocardii: Lancelets 

 Order Amphioxiformes

Family Pikaiidae † 
 Genus Pikaia †

Olfactores (unranked)

Subphylum Tunicata

Class Ascidiacea: Ascideans and sessile tunicates 

 Order Enterogona
 Order Pleurogona
 Order Aspiraculata

Class Thaliacea: Pelagic tunicates
 Order Doliolida
 Order Pyrosomida
 Order Salpida: salps

Class Appendicularia: Solitary, free-swimming tunicates 
 Order Copelata

Subphylum Vertebrates

Infraphylum Cyclostomata, Superclass Agnatha: Paraphyletic jawless vertebrates

Class Myxini: Hagfish 
 Order Myxiniformes
 Family Myxinidae

Class Hyperoartia: Lampreys and their † kin 
 Order Petromyzontiformes

Infraphylum Gnathostomata: Jawed vertebrates

Class Placodermi †
 Order Acanthothoraci
 Order Arthrodira
 Order Antiarchi
 Order Brindabellaspida
 Order Petalichthyida
 Order Phyllolepida
 Order Ptyctodontida
 Order Rhenanida
 Order Pseudopetalichthyida (The placement of this order is debated.)
 Order Stensioellida (The placement of this monotypic order is debated.)

Class Chondrichthyes: Cartilaginous fish 

 
 Subclass Elasmobranchii
 Superorder Batoidea
 Order Rajiformes: rays and skates
 Order Rhinopristiformes: sawfishes
 Order Torpediniformes: electric rays
 Order Myliobatiformes: (sting)rays
 Superorder Selachimorpha (sharks)
 Order Heterodontiformes: bullhead sharks
 Order Orectolobiformes: carpet sharks
 Order Carcharhiniformes: ground sharks
 Order Lamniformes: mackerel sharks
 Order Hexanchiformes: frilled and cow sharks
 Order Squaliformes: dogfish sharks
 Order Squatiniformes: angel sharks
 Order Pristiophoriformes: saw sharks
Subclass Holocephali
 Order Chimaeriformes: chimaeras

Class Acanthodii †

 Order Climatiiformes
 Order Ischnacanthiformes
 Order Acanthodiformes

Superclass Osteichthyes: Bony fish

Class Actinopterygii: Ray-finned fish 

 Order Asarotiformes †
 Order Discordichthyiformes †
 Order Paphosisciformes †
 Order Scanilepiformes †
 Order Cheirolepidiformes †
 Order Paramblypteriformes †
 Order Rhadinichthyiformes †
 Order Palaeonisciformes †
 Order Tarrasiiformes †
 Order Pachycormiformes †
 Order Ptycholepiformes †
 Order Redfieldiiformes †
 Order Haplolepidiformes †
 Order Aeduelliformes †
 Order Platysomiformes †
 Order Dorypteriformes †
 Order Eurynotiformes †
Subclass Cladistii
 Order Polypteriformes
Subclass Chondrostei
 Order Acipenseriformes: sturgeons and paddlefishes
Subclass Neopterygii

 Infraclass Holostei
 Order Lepisosteiformes, the gars
 Order Amiiformes, the bowfins
 Infraclass Teleostei
 Superorder Osteoglossomorpha
 Order Osteoglossiformes, the bony-tongued fishes
 Order Hiodontiformes, including the mooneye and goldeye
 Order Lycopteriformes
 Order Ichthyodectiformes †
 Superorder Elopomorpha
 Order Elopiformes, including the ladyfishes and tarpon
 Order Albuliformes, the bonefishes
 Order Notacanthiformes, including the halosaurs and spiny eels
 Order Anguilliformes, the true eels and gulpers
 Order Saccopharyngiformes, including the gulper eel
 Superorder Clupeomorpha
 Order Clupeiformes, including herrings and anchovies
 Superorder Ostariophysi
 Order Gonorynchiformes, including the milkfishes
 Order Cypriniformes, including barbs, carp, danios, goldfishes, loaches, minnows, rasboras
 Order Characiformes, including characins, pencilfishes, hatchetfishes, piranhas, tetras.
 Order Gymnotiformes, including electric eels and knifefishes
 Order Siluriformes, the catfishes
 Superorder Protacanthopterygii
 Order Salmoniformes, including salmon and trout
 Order Esociformes the pike
 Order Osmeriformes, including the smelts and galaxiids
 Superorder Stenopterygii
 Order Ateleopodiformes, the jellynose fish
 Order Stomiiformes, including the bristlemouths and marine hatchetfishes
 Superorder Cyclosquamata
 Order Aulopiformes, including the Bombay duck and lancetfishes
 Superorder Scopelomorpha
 Order Myctophiformes, including the lanternfishes
 Superorder Lampridiomorpha
 Order Lampriformes, including the oarfish, opah and ribbonfishes
 Superorder Polymyxiomorpha
 Order Polymixiiformes, the beardfishes
 Superorder Paracanthopterygii
 Order Percopsiformes, including the cavefishes and trout-perches
 Order Batrachoidiformes, the toadfishes
 Order Lophiiformes, including the anglerfishes
 Order Gadiformes, including cods
 Order Ophidiiformes, including the pearlfishes
 Superorder Acanthopterygii
 Order Mugiliformes, the mullets
 Order Atheriniformes, including silversides and rainbowfishes
 Order Beloniformes, including the flyingfishes
 Order Cetomimiformes, the whalefishes
 Order Cyprinodontiformes, including livebearers, killifishes
 Order Stephanoberyciformes, including the ridgeheads
 Order Beryciformes, including the fangtooths and pineconefishes
 Order Zeiformes, including the dories
 Order Gobiesociformes, the clingfishes
 Order Gasterosteiformes including sticklebacks, pipefishes, seahorses
 Order Syngnathiformes, including the seahorses and pipefishes
 Order Synbranchiformes, including the swamp eels
 Order Tetraodontiformes, including the filefishes and pufferfish
 Order Pleuronectiformes, the flatfishes
 Order Scorpaeniformes, including scorpionfishes and the sculpins
 Order Perciformes 40% of all fish including anabantids, centrarchids (incl. bass and sunfish), cichlids, gobies, gouramis, mackerel, perches, scats, whiting, wrasses

Class Sarcopterygii: Lobe-finned fish
 
Subclass Actinistia (coelacanths)
 Order Coelacanthiformes, the coelacanth
Subclass Dipnoi (lungfish)
 Order Ceratodontiformes
 Order Lepidosireniformes

Superclass Tetrapoda

Class Amphibia: Amphibians 
 
 Order Urodela or Caudata (salamanders)
 Order Anura (frogs and toads)
 Order Gymnophiona or Apoda (caecilians)

Class Reptilia: Reptiles 

 
 Subclass Diapsida
 Infraclass Archosauromorpha
 Superorder Crocodylomorpha
 Order Crocodilia (Crocodilians)
 Class Aves (Birds)
 Infraclass Lepidosauromorpha
 Superorder Lepidosauria
 Order Rhynchocephalia (tuataras)
 Order Squamata (lizards, snakes)
Subclass Anapsida
 Order Testudines (turtles and their kin)

Class Aves: Birds 

 
Subclass Neornithes
 Infraclass Palaeognathae
 Order Apterygiformes kiwis
 Order Casuariiformes cassowaries and emu
 Order Rheiformes rheas
 Order Struthioniformes, ostriches
 Order Tinamiformes, tinamous
 Infraclass Neognathae
 Superorder Galloanserae (fowl)
 Order Anseriformes, waterfowl
 Order Galliformes, fowl
 Superorder Neoaves
 Order Sphenisciformes, penguins
 Order Gaviiformes, loons
 Order Podicipediformes, grebes
 Order Procellariiformes, albatrosses, petrels, and allies
 Order Pelecaniformes, pelicans and allies
 Order Ciconiiformes, storks and allies
 Order Phoenicopteriformes, flamingos
 Order Accipitriformes, eagles, hawks and allies (taxonomists have traditionally placed these groups in the Falconiformes)
 Order Falconiformes, falcons
 Order Opisthocomiformes, hoatzin (this enigmatic bird was traditionally treated as a family within either the Galliformes or Cuculiformes)
 Order Gruiformes, cranes and allies
 Order Charadriiformes, plovers and allies
 Order Pterocliformes, sandgrouse (this enigmatic group was traditionally treated as a family in any of three different orders: Charadriiformes, Ciconiiformes, and Columbiformes)
 Order Columbiformes, doves and pigeons
 Order Psittaciformes, parrots and allies
 Order Cuculiformes, cuckoos
 Order Strigiformes, owls
 Order Caprimulgiformes, nightjars and allies
 Order Apodiformes, swifts
 Order Coliiformes, mousebirds
 Order Trogoniformes, trogons
 Order Coraciiformes, kingfishers
 Order Piciformes, woodpeckers and allies
 Order Passeriformes, passerines

Class Mammalia: Mammals 
 
Subclass Prototheria
 Order Monotremata, monotremes
Subclass Theria
 Infraclass Marsupialia
 Order Didelphimorphia, opossums
 Order Paucituberculata, rat opossums
 Order Microbiotheria, monito del monte
 Order Dasyuromorphia, marsupial carnivores
 Order Peramelemorphia, marsupial omnivores
 Order Notoryctemorphia, marsupial moles
 Order Diprotodontia, marsupial herbivores; kangaroos, wallabies, possums and allies
 Infraclass Eutheria
 Magnorder Atlantogenata
 Superorder Afrotheria
 Grandorder Afrosoricida
 Order Afrosoricida, tenrecs and golden moles
 Order Macroscelidea, elephant shrews
 Order Tubulidentata, aardvark
 Grandorder Paenungulata
 Order Hyracoidea, hyraxes
 Mirorder Tethytheria
 Order Proboscidea, elephants
 Order Sirenia, manatees and dugongs
 Superorder Xenarthra
 Order Cingulata, armadillos
 Order Pilosa, sloths and anteaters
 Magnorder Boreoeutheria
 Superorder Laurasiatheria
 Order Eulipotyphla, hedgehogs, shrews, moles
Grandorder Ferungulata
 Order Cetartiodactyla, cetaceans and even-toed ungulates
 Clade Pegasoferae
 Order Chiroptera, bats
 Mirorder Zooamata
 Order Perissodactyla, odd-toed ungulates; horses, rhinos, tapirs
 Clade Ferae
 Order Pholidota, pangolins
 Order Carnivora, carnivores; cats, dogs, bears, seals, sea lions and others
 Order †Creodonta hyaenodontidae hyeanodon, dissopsalis, sarkastostodon, and megistotherium.
 Superorder Euarchontoglires
 Grandorder Euarchonta
 Mirorder Sundatheria
 Order Dermoptera, colugos
 Order Scandentia, treeshrews
 Mirorder Primatomorpha
 Order Primates, lemurs, monkeys, apes and allies
 Grandorder Glires
 Order Rodentia, rodents
 Order Lagomorpha, rabbits, hares and pikas

See also

References 

Chordate orders
Chordate orders
Chordate
 List